Hurst is a village in the civil parish of St Nicholas Hurst in the English county of Berkshire.

Geography
The village is on the A321 Twyford – Wokingham road. There are a number of other smaller areas of sporadic development, the main ones being along Davis Street on the B3030 Twyford – Winnersh road, along the B3034 Forest Road, from Bill Hill to Binfield and on Broadcommon Road. 

The River Loddon flows north along the western side of the parish and a substantial proportion of the parish lies within the alluvial flood plain of this river and its tributaries. The most important exceptions to this are Church Hill just to the west of the village centre, and Ashridge to the south-east. The M4 motorway crosses the southern half of the parish but does not have any direct access within the parish. The A329(M) forms the south-west boundary, separating Hurst from Wokingham and Winnersh. The main London to Bristol railway line runs along the northern boundary, and Twyford railway station in the neighbouring parish of Twyford serves Hurst. Dinton Pastures Country Park is a country park located within Hurst.

Notable buildings

Parish church 
The Church of England parish church is dedicated to St Nicholas. The church is partly Norman and partly later medieval. The tower is of brick and was built in 1612. It contains eight bells, the largest six of which were cast in the 17th century. The two lightest bells were added in 1911. The church was restored in the 19th century by W. Fellows Prynne.  There are many monuments of the 17th and 18th centuries and much 17th-century woodwork.  Burial monuments include those of Lady Margaret Savile (d. 1631), widow of Sir Henry Savile, Provost of Eton College.

Country houses
Bill Hill on the Twyford Road is an 18th-century listed country house, formerly the home of the Leveson-Gower family. Haineshill House is a Grade II* listed building 17th century country house built originally by Thomas Windebank.  It was extended by James Edward Colleton in 1760.  Hinton House on Hinton Road is a Grade II* listed early 17th century house, built from red brick by William Hide  now part of the Dolphin School. Hurst Lodge on Broadcommon Road is a Grade II* listed 17th century house  built for the Barker family and later the property of the Countess of Buchan.  Barkers almshouses on Church Hill were erected and founded in 1664 by William Barker of Hurst Lodge.

Local government
St Nicholas Hurst is a civil parish with an elected parish council. It falls within the area of the unitary authority of Wokingham Borough. Both the parish council and the unitary authority are responsible for different aspects of local government.

Education
St Nicholas' Church of England Primary School is a voluntary controlled primary school in the village which educates children ages 5–11. The school was first built in 1843. The primary school shares a breakfast club with St. Nicholas Pre-school playgroup, a registered charity and member of the Pre-School Learning Alliance, which is open to all students and children of the playgroup. Dolphin School is a coeducational, independent preparatory day school and nursery school for children between the ages of 3 and 13.

References

External links

 Hurst Parish Council
 Hurst Village Society
 Hurst Local History
 Hurst Show and Country Fayre
 Hurst War Memorial

Villages in Berkshire
Borough of Wokingham